Pyshnograyev is a rural locality (a khutor) in Alexeyevsky District, Belgorod Oblast, Russia. The population was 8 as of 2010.

Geography 
Pyshnograyev is located 23 km southeast of Alexeyevka (the district's administrative centre) by road. Alexeyenkovo is the nearest rural locality.

References 

Rural localities in Alexeyevsky District, Belgorod Oblast
Biryuchensky Uyezd